The surname Rounds may refer to: 

 David Rounds (1930–1983), American actor
 Lil Rounds (born 1984), American singer
 Mike Rounds (born 1954), American politician from South Dakota
 Luke Rounds (born 1991), Australian footballer (Australian rules football)
 Tom Rounds (born 1936), American radio broadcasting executive

See also
Round (surname)